Liberty Township is one of the 25 townships of Licking County, Ohio, United States. As of the 2010 census, the population was 2,360, up from 1,797 at the 2000 census.

Geography
Located in the northwestern part of the county, it borders the following townships:
Bennington Township - north
Burlington Township - northeast corner
McKean Township - east
Granville Township - southeast corner
St. Albans Township - south
Jersey Township - southwest corner
Monroe Township - west
Hartford Township - northwest corner

No municipalities are located in Liberty Township.

Name and history
It is one of 25 Liberty Townships statewide.

Government
The township is governed by a three-member board of trustees, who are elected in November of odd-numbered years to a four-year term beginning on the following January 1. Two are elected in the year after the presidential election and one is elected in the year before it. There is also an elected township fiscal officer, who serves a four-year term beginning on April 1 of the year after the election, which is held in November of the year before the presidential election. Vacancies in the fiscal officership or on the board of trustees are filled by the remaining trustees.

References

External links

Townships in Licking County, Ohio
Townships in Ohio